Nai Bazar is a town and a nagar panchayat in Sant Ravidas Nagar district in the Indian state of Uttar Pradesh.

Demographics
 India census, Nai Bazar had a population of 11,887. Males constitute 54% of the population and females 46%. Nai Bazar has an average literacy rate of 53%, lower than the national average of 59.5%: male literacy is 63%, and female literacy is 41%. In Nai Bazar, 19% of the population is under 6 years of age.

References

Cities and towns in Bhadohi district